Khodoriv is a city in Stryi Raion, Lviv Oblast of western Ukraine. It hosts the administration of Khodoriv urban hromada, one of the hromadas of Ukraine.

The city was first mentioned in 1394. In many historic documents it is referred to as Khodoriv-stav. In many documents it is named Khodoriv-stav. It is connected with a male name Fedir and the situation of the town above a big lake. In the 15th century, Khodoriv was granted city status and a coat of arms.

Khodoriv was one of the major industrial hubs in Zhydachiv Raion and Lviv Oblast, with more than 10 manufacturing and other plants including the Sugar Plant and the Plant of Manufacturing Polygraph Machines. Within the city, there are three secondary education schools and two colleges. The city also has some monuments of architecture, including the St. Michael's Church. In addition, new church will rise in early 2000s, designed by Oleksandr Matviiv. Khodoriv has always been a big railroad hub in the region.

The Jewish population of Khodoriv  amounted to around 2500 at the beginning of the German occupation of the town in July 1941.  Immediately, the Germans and their Ukrainian collaborators robbed and abused Jews and burned down the Great Synagogue. In June 1942, the first Aktion rounded up about 1000 to 1500 Jews.  Those who were sick and weak were shot in Khodoriv, others were sent to Belzec where they were immediately murdered.  A similar Aktion took place in October, with 350 Jews deported to Belzec to be murdered.  After that about 800 Jews were left in the town.  In February 1943, the Ukrainian police murdered the rest near the local sugar plant.  Only 15 or so of the town's Jews survived, mostly hidden with friends and acquaintances.  Ten had been hidden by Henryk Piczek in his cellar for 22 months.

The historic wooden synagogue of Chodorow, built in 1652 and featuring a beautifully painted interior, was burned but a model of the ceiling has been reconstructed at the Museum of the Jewish People (Beth Hatefutsoth) in Tel Aviv, Israel.  See Yad Vashem's web site on the synagogue.

Until 18 July 2020, Khodoriv belonged to Zhydachiv Raion. The raion was abolished in July 2020 as part of the administrative reform of Ukraine, which reduced the number of raions of Lviv Oblast to seven. The area of Zhydachiv Raion was merged into Stryi Raion.

People from Khodoriv 
 Rabbi Yehoshia Heshl Eichenstein of Khodorov, son of Rabbi Alexander Yom Tov Lipa of Zidichov
 Rabbi Yisochor Berish Eichenstein of Khodorov (d. 1918), son of Rabbi Yehoshia Heshl of Khodorov
 Ihor Kalynets — Ukrainian poet and Soviet dissident,
 Blessed Tarsykiya Matskiv — Ukrainian Greek Catholic nun and martyr,
 Oswald Balzer — Polish historian,
 Maria Bartlowa — Polish activist, senator of the Second Polish Republic, wife of Prime Minister Kazimierz Bartel,
 Zdzislaw Trojanowski —   Polish ice-hockey player, who participated in the 1952 Winter Olympics,
 Yitzhak Golan — Israeli politician who served as a member of the Knesset.

References

External links 
 castles.com.ua - Khodoriv
 https://khodoriv.info/ News about Khodoriv (in Ukrainian)

 
Cities in Lviv Oblast
Ruthenian Voivodeship
Kingdom of Galicia and Lodomeria
Shtetls
Cities of district significance in Ukraine